Rebecca Elizabeth Feldman, OAM (born 8 February 1982 in Melbourne, Victoria)  is a wheelchair racer from Victoria, Australia.  She won a gold medal at the 2000 Sydney Games in the women's 400 m T34 event, for which she received a Medal of the Order of Australia, a silver medal in the 100m T34 event and a bronze medal in the 200m T34 event. In 2000, she received an Australian Sports Medal.

After her career as a Paralympian, Rebecca became involved in disability advocacy, including with young people and people with multiple and complex disabilities. Her roles have included individual and systemic advocacy, case management, peer group facilitation and community development across the disability service provision and local government sectors. She has worked on a range of projects including housing, access to live music, short-film and volunteering as well as staff and customer training.

Rebecca is currently part of Leadership Victoria’s disability leadership program.

Rebecca is also active in the leadership of Neighbourhood Connect Inc, an Australian charity and national not-for-profit community organisation that facilitates the re-connection of people in their local neighbourhoods, as advocated by Hugh Mackay.

References

External links
 Rebecca Feldman - Athletics Australia Results

Paralympic athletes of Australia
Athletes (track and field) at the 2000 Summer Paralympics
Paralympic gold medalists for Australia
Paralympic silver medalists for Australia
Paralympic bronze medalists for Australia
Recipients of the Medal of the Order of Australia
Recipients of the Australian Sports Medal
Living people
Medalists at the 2000 Summer Paralympics
1982 births
Paralympic medalists in athletics (track and field)